Denis Noel Smith (23 December 1932 – 2004) was an English professional footballer who played as a full-back.

Smith died in North East Lincolnshire in 2004.

References

1932 births
2004 deaths
Footballers from Grimsby
English footballers
Association football fullbacks
Grimsby Town F.C. players
Goole Town F.C. players
English Football League players